The Pentax smc FA 43mm F1.9 Limited is a normal prime lens for Pentax K-mount.
It has also been sold as an Leica S-mount version in Japan.

References
www.dpreview.com
www.pentax.co.jp

External links

43